Crow people can refer to:

 Crow Tribe of Montana, a Native American tribe
 , a Japanese legendary creature resembling an anthropomorphic crow
 Kenku, an anthropomorphic crow race in the Dungeons & Dragons fantasy universe loosely based on the tengu